The Dutch Eredivisie in the 1993–94 season was contested by 18 teams. Ajax won the championship.

League standings

Results

Promotion/relegation play-offs
In the promotion/relegation competition, eight entrants (six from this the Eerste Divisie and two from this league) entered in two groups. The group winners were promoted (or remained in) to the Eredivisie.

See also
 1993–94 Eerste Divisie
 1993–94 KNVB Cup

References

External links
Eredivisie official website - Info on all seasons  
Season results, at rsssf

Eredivisie seasons
Netherlands
1993–94 in Dutch football